John P. Otjen (born January 7, 1942) is a retired United States Army officer. He attained the rank of lieutenant general, and his command assignments included First United States Army and the 8th Infantry Division.

Early life
John Putnam Otjen was born on January 7, 1942, in San Antonio, Texas, the son of Theo Putnam Otjen and Jean Mather Leesly. Otjen grew up in Elm Grove, Wisconsin. In 1960, he graduated from Brookfield High School in Brookfield, Wisconsin.

Otjen attended the United States Military Academy. The Corps of Cadets took part in a 1964 birthday celebration for Douglas MacArthur (MacArthur's last). During preparations for the event, organizers realized that Otjen's great-grandfather Theobald Otjen was the Congressman who had appointed MacArthur to West Point in 1899. This resulted in Otjen getting to meet MacArthur for an individual discussion, and both the family connection and the meeting were widely reported in United States newspapers.

Military career

Early career
After his 1964 graduation from West Point, Otjen completed the Infantry Officer Basic Course and Ranger School. Otjen was also a graduate of Airborne School and the Pathfinder course. In 1965, he was assigned to the 1st Battalion, 506th Infantry, a unit of the 101st Airborne Division.

In 1966, Otjen went to Vietnam as a liaison officer on the staff of the 2nd Battalion, 14th Infantry, a unit of the 25th Infantry Division. His continued Vietnam War service with the 25th Division included platoon leader, executive officer, and commander of 2d Battalion's Company A, and aide-de-camp to the 25th Division commander, John C. F. Tillson. He was promoted to captain in 1967.

Otjen completed the Infantry Officer Advanced Course, and also graduated from the University of Wisconsin in 1971 with a Master of Business Administration. He was promoted to major in 1974, and graduated from the United States Army Command and General Staff College in 1976.

In 1977, Otjen was assigned to the 2d Battalion, 9th Infantry, 3d Brigade, 2d Infantry Division in South Korea. From 1979 to 1981, Otjen commanded 2d Battalion, 16th Infantry, which had recently been re-flagged from 2d Battalion, 9th Infantry.

In 1981 Otjen graduated from the United States Army War College, after which he served as assistant chief of staff for personnel (G-1) on the staff of the 8th Infantry Division. From 1982 to 1985 he commanded the 2d Brigade, 8th Infantry Division.

After completing his brigade command, Otjen served as chief of staff for the 1st Armored Division, and deputy chief of staff for support at Central Army Group in Heidelberg, West Germany.

General officer
From 1989 to 1990, Otjen was assistant division commander of the 8th Infantry Division. He commanded the division from 1990 to 1992, and began the process of mobilizing the organization to take part in Operation Desert Storm. Some 8th Division units took part in the conflict, but the bulk of the division did not deploy before the conflict ended. Otjen was the 8th Division's last commander before the organization was inactivated in 1992.

From 1992 to 1993, Otjen was the Army's Deputy Inspector General for inspections, training and automation. During his time in this post, Otjen was co-chairman of a working group which provided advice to the Secretary of Defense on the issue of lifting the government's ban on homosexuals being allowed to serve in the military. The group recommended keeping the ban in place; Secretary of Defense Les Aspin considered this recommendation and several other options before issuing the regulations that became known as the "Don't ask, don't tell" policy.

From 1993 to 1995, Otjen was commander of First United States Army, and oversaw the organization's relocation from Fort Meade to Fort Gillem. Otjen retired in 1995.

Post-military career
After his retirement from the military, Otjen was deputy director of the George C. Marshall European Center for Security Studies. He was later an executive with L3, a defense contractor.

Awards and decorations

Family
Otjen and his wife Ann M. Otjen are the parents of three children, Thomas, Michael and Sarah.

References

Sources

Newspapers

Internet

Magazines

|-

1942 births
Living people
Military personnel from San Antonio
People from Elm Grove, Wisconsin
United States Military Academy alumni
United States Army Command and General Staff College alumni
United States Army War College alumni
Wisconsin School of Business alumni
United States Army generals
United States Army personnel of the Vietnam War
Recipients of the Distinguished Service Medal (US Army)
Recipients of the Defense Superior Service Medal
Recipients of the Legion of Merit
Military personnel from Wisconsin